Arbelodes meridialis is a moth in the family Cossidae. It is found in south-eastern South Africa, where it has been recorded from the Orange Free State, the Eastern Cape and KwaZulu-Natal. The habitat consists of temperate and subtropical grasslands.

The length of the forewings is about 12 mm for males and 12.5 mm for females. The forewings are light yellowish olive, but drab-grey with light brownish olive spots at the costal margin. The hindwings are olive buff.

References

Natural History Museum Lepidoptera generic names catalog

Endemic moths of South Africa
Metarbelinae
Moths described in 1896